Jésus Arenzana (7 June 1918 – 22 March 2011) was a French wrestler. He competed in the men's Greco-Roman bantamweight at the 1948 Summer Olympics.

References

External links
 

1918 births
2011 deaths
French male sport wrestlers
Olympic wrestlers of France
Wrestlers at the 1948 Summer Olympics
People from Calahorra
Sportspeople from La Rioja